The 2022–23 West Ham United F.C. Women season is the club's 32nd season in existence and their fifth in the Women's Super League, the highest level of the football pyramid. Along with competing in the WSL, the club will also contest two domestic cup competitions: the FA Cup and the League Cup.

On 8 May 2022, following the final game of the 2021–22 season, it was announced head coach Olli Harder had informed the club of his resignation to pursue new opportunities. Assistant manager Paul Konchesky was immediately announced as his successor on a two-year contract.

Squad

Preseason

Women's Super League

Results summary

Results by matchday

Results

League table

Women's FA Cup 

As a member of the first tier, West Ham entered the FA Cup in the fourth round proper.

FA Women's League Cup

Group stage

Knockout stage

Squad statistics

Appearances 

Starting appearances are listed first, followed by substitute appearances after the + symbol where applicable.

|-
|colspan="14"|Players who appeared for the club but left during the season:

|}

Transfers

Transfers in

Loans in

Transfers out

Loans out

References 

West Ham United